{{DISPLAYTITLE:C24H36O3}}
The molecular formula C24H36O3 may refer to:

 Anagestone acetate
 Nabilone
 Nandrolone caproate
 Testosterone isovalerate
 Testosterone valerate